Nalanda Lok Sabha constituency is one of the 40 Lok Sabha (parliamentary) constituencies in Bihar state in eastern India.

Assembly segments
Presently, Nalanda Lok Sabha constituency comprises the following seven Vidhan Sabha (legislative assembly) segments:

Members of Parliament

^ by poll

Election Results

See also
 Nalanda district
 List of Constituencies of the Lok Sabha

References

External links
Nalanda lok sabha  constituency election 2019 result details

Lok Sabha constituencies in Bihar
Politics of Nalanda district
Politics of Sheikhpura district
Lok Sabha constituency